The Flores shrew (Suncus mertensi) is a white-toothed shrew found only on Flores Island, Indonesia. It is listed as a endangered species due to habitat loss and a restricted range.

References

Suncus
Mammals of Indonesia
Mammals of Asia
Mammals described in 1974